There were three cycling events at the 2003 Pan American Games: road cycling, track cycling and mountain bike. The competition started on 2003-08-10 with the Mountain Bike competition (men and women), and ended on 2003-08-17 with the Men's Road Race.

Road Cycling

Men's Events

Women's Events

Track Cycling

Men's Events

Women's Events

Mountain Bike

Medals table

References
 Results

 
2003
Events at the 2003 Pan American Games
2003 in road cycling
2003 in track cycling
2003 in mountain biking
2003 in cycle racing
International cycle races hosted by the Dominican Republic